The county governor of Hedmark county in Norway represented the central government administration in the county. On 1 January 2019, the office was merged with the County Governor of Oppland into the County Governor of Innlandet.

The large Akershus stiftamt was established in 1664 by the King and it had several subordinate counties (amt). On 11 April 1781, the large Kristians amt was divided into two: Hedemarkens amt (later named "Hedmark") in the east and Kristians amt (later named "Oppland") in the west. In 2020, Hedmark and Oppland counties were merged into Innlandet county.

The county governor is the government's representative in the county. The governor carries out the resolutions and guidelines of the Storting and Government. This is done first by the county governor performing administrative tasks on behalf of the ministries. Secondly, the county governor also monitors the activities of the municipalities and is the appeal body for many types of municipal decisions.

Names
The word for county (amt or fylke) has changed over time as has the name of the county. From 1781 until 1918, the title was Amtmann i Hedemarkens amt. From 1 January 1919 until 1 January 2019, the title was Fylkesmann i Hedmark fylke.

List of county governors
Hedmark county has had the following governors:

References

Hedmark